Tony Kushner is an American playwright and screenwriter.

Lauded for his work on stage he's most known for his seminal work Angels in America which earned a Pulitzer Prize and a Tony Award. At the turn of the 21st Century he became known for his numerous film collaborations with Steven Spielberg which have garnered him a Golden Globe Award and nominations for two Academy Awards, and a BAFTA Award. He received the National Medal of Arts from President Barack Obama in 2013.

Major associations

Academy Awards

BAFTA Awards

Emmy Awards

Grammy Awards

Golden Globe Awards

Olivier Awards

Tony Awards

Honours 
 1990 Whiting Award
 1993 Pulitzer Prize for Drama – Angels in America: Millennium Approaches
 2002 PEN/Laura Pels International Foundation for Theater Award for a playwright in mid-career
 2008 Steinberg Distinguished Playwright Award
 2011 Puffin/Nation Prize for Creative Citizenship
 2012 St. Louis Literary Award from the Saint Louis University Library Associates
 2012 New York Film Critics Circle Award for Best Screenplay – Lincoln
 2012 Paul Selvin Award – Lincoln
 2013 Elected Member, American Philosophical Society
 2013: The Lincoln Forum's Richard Nelson Current Award of Achievement
 American Academy of Arts and Letters Award
 Lila Wallace/Reader's Digest Fellowship
 National Foundation of Jewish Culture, Cultural Achievement award

Miscellaneous 
 1993 Drama Desk Award for Outstanding Play – Angels in America: Millennium Approaches
 1994 Drama Desk Award for Outstanding Play – Angels in America: Perestroika 
 2004 Drama Desk Award for Outstanding Book of a Musical – Caroline, or Change
 2012 AACTA International Award for Best Screenplay – Lincoln
 2012 Writers Guild of America Award for Best Adapted Screenplay – Lincoln
 2021 Writers Guild of America Award for Best Adapted Screenplay – West Side Story

References

External links

Kushner, Tony